Corazón (Spanish: "heart") is an inactive, eroded stratovolcano of Ecuador, situated about 30 km southwest of Quito in the western slopes of the Andes.

See also

Lists of volcanoes
List of volcanoes in Ecuador

References

External links 
 Corazon 2003
 "El Corazon, Ecuador" on Peakbagger
 

Inactive volcanoes
Stratovolcanoes of Ecuador
Four-thousanders of the Andes
Pleistocene stratovolcanoes